Anatoly Leonidovich Adamishin (born 11 October 1934) is a Russian diplomat, politician and businessman.

Adamishin graduated from Moscow State University, and went on to work in various diplomatic posts in the central offices of the Ministry of Foreign Affairs and abroad.

From 1986 to 1990, he served as Deputy Minister of Foreign Affairs of the Soviet Union, in charge of African, humanitarian and cultural affairs. From 1990 to 1992, Adamishin was the Ambassador of the Soviet Union, and then Russia, to Italy. Then, from 1992 until 1994, he became the 1st Deputy Minister of Foreign Affairs. 

On 12 December 1993 he was elected to the 1st State Duma by the list of Yavlinsky-Boldyrev-Lukin bloc. He remained in the position of Deputy Minister, and in this regard, he resigned as member of parliament on 11 May 1994. He did not attend the sessions, and was nominally a member of the Committee on CIS Affairs and Relations with Compatriots. From 1994 to 1997, Adamishin was the Ambassador of Russia to the United Kingdom.

Adamishin speaks Russian, English, Italian, Ukrainian, and French.

Selected works
  (History of Soviet Foreign Policy), with Aleksandr Berežkin and Andrej Gromyko (1980)
  ( (International Cooperation in the Field of Human Rights: Documents and Materials)) (1993)
 Transnational Terrorism in the World System Perspective, with Ryszard Stemplowski (2002)
 Human Rights, Perestroika, and the End of the Cold War, with Richard Schifter (2009)

References

1934 births
Living people
Moscow State University alumni
First convocation members of the State Duma (Russian Federation)
Knights Grand Cross of the Order of Merit of the Italian Republic
Recipients of the Order of Friendship of Peoples
Recipients of the Order of the Red Banner of Labour
Ambassadors of Russia to Italy
Ambassadors of Russia to the United Kingdom
Ambassadors of the Soviet Union to Italy
Russian memoirists
Yabloko politicians